Julius Silverman (8 December 1905 – 21 September 1996) was a British Labour Party politician.

Silverman, whose father escaped anti-Jewish pogroms in Minsk, Russian Empire, was born in Leeds. He attended Leeds Central High School and first worked as a warehouseman. He later became a barrister, called by Gray's Inn in 1931, and practised in Birmingham. He served as a councillor on Birmingham City Council 1934–45.

Silverman contested Birmingham Moseley in 1935. He was a Member of Parliament (MP) for 38 years, for Birmingham Erdington (1945–1955 and 1974–1983) and Birmingham Aston (1955–1974).

He was granted Honorary Freedom of the City of Birmingham in 1982 and died in Birmingham aged 90.

References 

 Obituary in The Independent, 24 September 1996
Times Guide to the House of Commons, 1951, 1966 & 1979

External links 
 

1905 births
1996 deaths
Labour Party (UK) MPs for English constituencies
Councillors in Birmingham, West Midlands
UK MPs 1945–1950
UK MPs 1950–1951
UK MPs 1951–1955
UK MPs 1955–1959
UK MPs 1959–1964
UK MPs 1964–1966
UK MPs 1966–1970
UK MPs 1970–1974
UK MPs 1974
UK MPs 1974–1979
UK MPs 1979–1983
Members of Gray's Inn
20th-century British lawyers
Jewish British politicians
Recipients of the Padma Bhushan in public affairs
Politicians from Leeds